Anubias barteri var. glabra is a variety of A. barteri that was first described by N. E. Brown in 1901.

Synonyms
 Anubias minima Chevalier, 1909
 Anubias lanceolata N. E. Brown

Distribution
West Africa: Guinea, Liberia, Ivory Coast, Cameroon, Bioko, Gabon, Democratic Republic of the Congo.

Description
This plant's long-stemmed dark green leave blades are less than 5 times as long as wide, 1.5–9 cm broad (usually broader than 3.5 cm) and 6–21 cm long. The petioles are 3–35 cm long, from 0.5-1.5 times as long as the blade.

Cultivation
Like most Anubias species, this plant grows well partially and fully submersed and the rhizome must be above the substrate, attached to rocks or wood. It grows well in a range of lighting and prefers a temperature range of 22-28 degrees C. It can be propagated by dividing the rhizome or by separating side shoots.

References

barteri var. glabra
Aquatic plants
Flora of Cameroon
Plants described in 1901
Flora of Guinea
Flora of Liberia
Flora of Ivory Coast
Flora of Gabon
Flora of the Democratic Republic of the Congo